Shoba Chandrasekhar (born 24 August 1948) is an Indian playback singer, director, writer and film producer. She is the mother of actor Vijay.

Musical training
Her early guru was Shri Meenakshi Sundaram. Later, she joined the Tamil Nadu Government Music College and pursued her studies from the great tutors in the college such as Vidwan Shri T.M. Thiagarajan. She also had the opportunity to learn Veena playing from Smt. Kalpakam Swaminathan at the music college. For the past five years she has been learning vocal carnatic music from Smt. Brinda Thiagarajan – daughter of Shri Maharajapuram Santhanam.

Awards and titles
She has been honoured with the Lifetime Achievement Mrs. Chennai award by the Esthel Hotels and Resorts. Shoba Chandrasekhar, a singer, has been given this award for her philanthropic activities in Chennai as well as for being a good mother and wife.

Others
She has been appointed as the Artistic Heritage Consultant by the order of the Tamil Nadu Chief Minister J. Jayalalitha.

Film career
She was a singer in light music troupes. She later graduated to singing in films. Her first film song was "Maharaja Oru Maharani..." from the film Iru Malargal. 

She has written several stories that have been made into movies by moviemaker husband S. A. Chandrasekhar. She turned film producer and then became a film director. She has also performed at various classical concerts. She has also recently released a devotional album titled "Anaimuganum Arumuganum", that talks about her singing career.

Her first light classical music programme was telecast on Vijay TV in April 2003. The title of the programme was "Samarpanam". Her first live concert was for the Maharajapuram Santhanam Trust. She has sung in nearly all the films made by her husband.

She has produced 10 films and written stories for more than 50. She also directed two films, Nanbargal and Innisai Mazhai. In fact, Chandrasekhar worked as her associate director in these films. He was assisted by Shankar, now a famous director. The management of the Esthel hotels and resorts said that Shoba is a perfect example of an egoless person. She also sang over 12 movies.

Personal life
Shoba is married to film director S. A. Chandrasekhar. Their son Vijay is a popular actor in Tamil cinema. Their daughter Vidya passed away at a young age. Shoba's brother S. N. Surendar is also a playback singer and voice actor.

Filmography

As a playback singer

References

External links
 

Indian women film producers
Film producers from Chennai
Indian women film directors
Tamil screenwriters
Indian women playback singers
Tamil playback singers
Kannada playback singers
Living people
Singers from Chennai
Women artists from Tamil Nadu
Tamil film directors
Kannada screenwriters
Tamil dramatists and playwrights
Indian women dramatists and playwrights
20th-century Indian women artists
21st-century Indian women artists
20th-century Indian dramatists and playwrights
21st-century Indian dramatists and playwrights
20th-century Indian film directors
21st-century Indian film directors
Film directors from Chennai
21st-century Indian singers
Screenwriters from Chennai
Indian women screenwriters
20th-century Indian women writers
Women writers from Tamil Nadu
21st-century Indian women singers
20th-century Indian women singers
20th-century Indian singers
1948 births
Businesswomen from Tamil Nadu
20th-century Indian businesswomen
20th-century Indian businesspeople
21st-century Indian businesswomen
21st-century Indian businesspeople
21st-century Indian women writers
21st-century Indian writers